Hund, known in antiquity as Udabhandapura, is a small village in Swabi district, situated on the right bank of the Indus River in the Khyber Pakhtunkhwa province of Pakistan. It is about 15 km upstream of Attock Fort and is located 80 km to the east of Peshawar.

It was the site of Alexander the Great's crossing of the Indus in 327 BC, and an important site of Gandhara ruins. It is also the site of Hund Museum.

History 
It was Turk Shahi capital of Gandhara, which possibly functioned as a winter capital alternating with the summer capital of Kabul, within their kingdom of Kapisa-Gandhara in the 7-9th century AD.

Hund was also the last capital of Gandhara, following Charsadda (then Pushkalavati) and Peshawar (then known as Purushapura), under the Hindu Shahi rulers until the beginning of 11th century AD, when Mahmud of Ghazni defeated Anandapala, the last Hindu Shahi ruler in Gandhara. The Hindu Shahi capital was then shifted to Nandana in the Salt Range, Punjab. It has also been said that the Mongol invader Genghis Khan also followed Khwarezm Shah up to Hund, before the prince jumped into the Indus River on his way to India.

Geography 
The village Hund is surrounded by a fort, remains of which are still visible. There were four gates of the walled city which are visible till to date and were used as entry and exit points. It is said that of the walled city a deep trench was also dug to control un authorized entry. The trench was crossed by a movable wooden bridge which used to be lifted at night by the guards of the gates and Garrison closed at night. According to some historians there was a tunnel inside the walled city which connected Hund Garrison with Attock Fort so that both Garrisons can reinforce each other in case of attack and used the tunnel as a withdrawal route in case a Garrison fell into enemy hands.

Old relics and remains of ancient civilizations have been found in the village after excavation work was undertaken by the government in recent past. The history and past glory of the Hund has been preserved by the govt by constructing a museum in the village on the bank of river Indus. A replica of tower of Olympia has also been constructed watching the mighty Indus in the memory of Alexander the Great who crossed river Indus and stayed in Hund during his last military campaign of the Indian sub continent.

Settlements 
The settlements of Balar Khel are mainly in villages Zaida, Maini, Yaqubi, Yar Hussain, Hund, Ambar, Lahor, Kaddi and Panj Pir in Swabi District of Khyber Pakhtunkhwa in Pakistan.

See also
Hund Museum
Takht Bhai

References

Populated places in Swabi District
Archaeological sites in Khyber Pakhtunkhwa
Kabul Shahi
History of Buddhism in Pakistan
History of Khyber Pakhtunkhwa
Populated places along the Silk Road
Gandhara
Swabi District